Gülşen Samancı (born 21 February 2000) is a Turkish swimmer. She competed in the women's 50 metre breaststroke at the 2019 World Aquatics Championships held in Gwangju, South Korea and she did not advance to compete in the semi-finals.

References

External links
 

2000 births
Living people
Turkish female swimmers
Place of birth missing (living people)
Turkish female breaststroke swimmers
Swimmers at the 2015 European Games
European Games competitors for Turkey
Swimmers at the 2018 Mediterranean Games
Swimmers at the 2018 Summer Youth Olympics
Mediterranean Games competitors for Turkey
21st-century Turkish women